Hesperilla ornata, also known as the spotted skipper or spotted sedge-skipper, is a species of butterfly in the family Hesperiidae. It is found along the non-tropical eastern seaboard of mainland Australia and in the adjacent mountain ranges.

The wingspan is about 40 mm.

The larvae feed on various Carex and Gahnia species, including Carex brunnea, Carex longebrachiata, Gahnia aspera, Gahnia clarkei, Gahnia erythrocarpa, Gahnia grandis, Gahnia melanocarpa, Gahnia radula and Gahnia sieberiana.

Subspecies
Hesperilla ornata monotherm  (Lower, 1907)  (Queensland)
Hesperilla ornata ornata  (Leach, 1814)  - spotted skipper (New South Wales, Queensland, Victoria)

References

External links
Australian Insects
Australian Faunal Directory

Trapezitinae
Butterflies described in 1814
Butterflies of Australia
Taxa named by William Elford Leach